No Mercy may refer to:

Books and comics 
 No Mercy, a 2010 novel in the Dark-Hunter series by Sherrilyn Kenyon
 No Mercy, a comic book series by Alex de Campi and Carla Speed McNeil

Film
 No Mercy (1986 film), an American film directed by Richard Pearce
 No Mercy (2010 film), a South Korean film directed by Kim Hyeong-jun
 No Mercy (2019 film), a South Korean film directed by Im Gyeong-taek

Music
 No Mercy (metal band), a 1980s American thrash metal band
 No Mercy (pop band), a 1990s German dance pop group
 No Mercy Festival, an annual heavy metal music festival in Europe

Albums 
 No Mercy (Blac Monks album) or the title song, 1998
 No Mercy (Da Youngsta's album) or the title song, 1994
 No Mercy (Daddy Yankee album), 1995
 No Mercy (No Mercy album) or My Promise, by the dance pop band, 1996
 No Mercy (T.I. album) or the title song, 2010
 No Mercy (EP), by B.A.P, or the title song, 2012

Songs 
 "No Mercy" (Marky Mark song), 1995
 "No Mercy" (The Stranglers song), 1984
 "No Mercy" (Ty Herndon song), 2000
 "No Mercy", by Ghetts from Conflict of Interest, 2021
 "No Mercy", by Immortal Technique from Revolutionary Vol. 1, 2001
 "No Mercy", by Khaleel, 1999
 "No Mercy", by L.A. Guns from L.A. Guns, 1988
 "No Mercy", by Nils Lofgren from Nils, 1979
 "No Mercy", by Racoon, 2011
 "No Mercy", by Young M.A from Herstory in the Making, 2019
 "No Mercy", from the video game soundtrack album The Music of Command & Conquer, 1995

Television
 WWE No Mercy, a professional wrestling pay-per-view event, 1999–2008 and 2016–2017
 No.Mercy, a 2014 reality survival show that created the South Korean band Monsta X
 "No Mercy" (The Gifted), a television episode
 "No Mercy" (Mercy Point), a television episode

Video games
 WWF No Mercy (video game), a 2000 video game named for the PPV event
 "No Mercy", a campaign in the 2008 video game Left 4 Dead
 "No Mercy", a mission in the 2011 video game Payday: The Heist

People with the nickname 
 Isabelle Mercier (born 1975), Canadian poker player
 Nozomi Sasaki (model) (born 1988), Japanese model

See also
 
 Show No Mercy (disambiguation)
 Show Them No Mercy!, 1935 American crime film